Zeno's Conscience is a novel by Italian writer Italo Svevo. The main character is Zeno Cosini, and the book is the fictional character's memoirs that he keeps because his psychiatrist recommended to do so in order to overcome his illness. He writes about his father, his business, his wife, and his tobacco habit. The original English translation was published under the title Confessions of Zeno.

After two novels, Una vita and Senilità, were ignored by critics and public, and after a long period of literary silence, entirely devoted to work, in 1923 Svevo self-published this novel, quite different in style. It was appreciated by a close friend of Svevo's, James Joyce, who presented the book to two French critics, Valéry Larbaud and Benjamin Crémieux. The success of the novel expanded to Italy, thanks to the poet Eugenio Montale.

The previous novels follow a naturalistic model; Zeno's Conscience, instead, is narrated in the first person, and is focused entirely on the character's thoughts and feelings. Moreover, Zeno is an unreliable narrator, since in the very first page his doctor, publishing the diary, says that it is made of truths and lies. However, there are important similarities among Svevo's three novels. Even in the third-person narrative of Una vita and Senilità, the reader knows only the point of view of the main characters; and these are, or feel, unfit to live. The titles are revealing: Una vita had previously the title Un inetto (An unfit); Senilità (literally Senility) is a state of mind, a feeling of weakness in front of everyday life events and encounters. As to La coscienza di Zeno, the title's ambiguity causes the different ways it is translated not only into English, but also into German (Zenos Gewissen, Zenos Bewusstsein). Zeno talks of his various failures, of his feeling ill and looking for a cure he'll never find. In the end, however, he recognizes that life itself is an illness, and it always brings to death.

Plot summary
The novel is presented as a diary written by Zeno, published by his doctor (who claims that it is full of lies). The doctor has left a little note in the beginning, saying he had Zeno write an autobiography to help him in his psychoanalysis. The doctor has published the work as revenge for Zeno discontinuing his visits.

The diary, however, does not follow chronological order; instead, it is structured in large chapters, each developing a particular theme (tobacco addiction, his father's death, the story of his marriage, and so on). Only the last chapter is a real diary, with pages referring to specific dates at the time of the First World War.

Zeno first writes about his cigarette addiction and cites the first times he smoked. In his first few paragraphs, he remembers his life as a child. One of his friends bought cigarettes for his brother and him. Soon, he steals money from his father to buy tobacco, but finally decides not to do this out of shame. Eventually, he starts to smoke his father's half-smoked cigars instead.

The problem with his "last cigarette" starts when he is twenty. He contracts a fever and his doctor tells him that to heal he must abstain from smoking. He decides smoking is bad for him and smokes his "last cigarette" so he can quit. However, this is not his last and he soon becomes plagued with "last cigarettes." He attempts to quit on days of important events in his life and soon obsessively attempts to quit on the basis of the harmony in the numbers of dates. Each time, the cigarette fails to truly be the last. He goes to doctors and asks friends to help him give up the habit, but to no avail. He even commits himself into a clinic, but escapes. The whole theme, while objectively serious, is often treated in a humorous way.

When Zeno reaches his thirties, his father's health begins to deteriorate. He starts to live closer to his father in case he passes away. Zeno is very different from his father, who is a serious man, while Zeno likes to joke. For instance, when his father states that Zeno is crazy, Zeno goes to the doctor and gets an official certification that he is sane. He shows this to his father who is hurt by this joke and becomes even more convinced that Zeno must be crazy. His father is also afraid of death, being very uncomfortable with the drafting of his will. One night, his father falls gravely ill and loses consciousness. The doctor comes and works on the patient, who is brought out of the clutches of death momentarily. Over the next few days, his father is able to get up and regains a bit of his self. He is restless and shifts positions for comfort often, even though the doctor says that staying in bed would be good for his circulation. One night, as his father tries to roll out of bed, Zeno blocks him from moving, to do as the doctor wished. His angry father then stands up and accidentally slaps Zeno in the face before dying. His last action will haunt Zeno until he reaches his sixties, as he is not able to tell if it was a final punishment or just his illness taking over his body. 

His memoirs then trace how he meets his wife. When he is starting to learn about the business world, he meets his future father-in-law Giovanni Malfenti, an intelligent and successful businessman, whom Zeno admires. Malfenti has four daughters, Ada, Augusta, Alberta, and Anna, and when Zeno meets them, he decides that he wants to court Ada because of her beauty and since Alberta is quite young, while he regards Augusta as too plain, and Anna is only a little girl. He is unsuccessful and the Malfentis think that he is actually trying to court Augusta, who had fallen in love with him. He soon meets his rival for Ada's love, who is Guido Speier. Guido speaks perfect Tuscan (while Zeno speaks the dialect of Trieste), is handsome, and has a full head of hair (compared with Zeno's bald head). That evening, while Guido and Zeno both visit the Malfentis, Zeno proposes to Ada and she rejects him for Guido. Zeno then proposes to Alberta, who is not interested in marrying, and he is rejected by her also. Finally, he proposes to Augusta (who knows that Zeno first proposed to the other two) and she accepts, because she loves him.

Very soon, the couples get married and Zeno starts to realize that he can love Augusta. This surprises him as his love for her does not diminish. However, he meets Carla, a poor aspiring singer, and they start an affair, with Carla thinking that Zeno does not love his wife. Meanwhile, Ada and Guido marry and Mr. Malfenti gets sick. Zeno's affection for both Augusta and Carla increases and he has a daughter named Antonia around the time Giovanni passes away. Finally, one day, Carla expresses a sudden whim to see Augusta. Zeno deceives Carla and causes her to meet Ada instead. Carla misrepresents Ada as Zeno's wife, and moved by her beauty and sadness, breaks off the affair.

Zeno goes on to relate the business partnership between him and Guido. The two men set up a merchant business together in Trieste. They hire two workers named Luciano and Carmen (who becomes Guido's mistress) and they attempt to make as much profit as possible. However, due to Guido's obsession with debts and credit as well as with the notion of profit, the company does poorly. Guido and Ada's marriage begins to crumble as does Ada's health and beauty, due to Morbus Basedowii (Basedow's disease). Guido fakes a suicide attempt to gain Ada's compassion and she asks Zeno to help Guido's failing company. Guido starts playing on the Bourse (stock exchange) and loses even more money. On a fishing trip, he asks Zeno about the differences in effects between sodium veronal and veronal and Zeno answers that sodium veronal is fatal while veronal is not. Guido's gambling on the Bourse becomes very destructive and he finally tries to fake another suicide to gain Ada's compassion. However, he is not believed by his doctor and his wife and dies. Soon thereafter, Zeno misses Guido's funeral because he himself gambles Guido's money on the Bourse and recovers three quarters of the losses.

Zeno describes his current life during the Great War.  His daughter Antonia (who greatly resembles Ada) and son Alfio have grown up. He spends his time visiting doctors, looking for a cure to his imagined sickness. One of the doctors claims he is suffering from the Oedipus complex, but Zeno does not believe it to be true. Not a single doctor is able to treat him.

In May 1915, while Italy is still neutral, as Zeno wants it to be, he and his family spend a vacation on the green banks of the Isonzo. Zeno does not yet guess that area will soon become a major battlefield. Renting a house in the village of Lucinico, he sets out on a casual morning stroll without his hat and jacket – when the outbreak of the war between Italy and Austro-Hungary turns the area into a war zone and Zeno is separated from his wife and children by the frontline. Forced to go back to Trieste alone, only much later does he find out that Augusta and the children reached Turin safely.

The final entry is from March 1916, after Zeno, alone in wartorn Trieste, has become wealthy by speculating and hoarding, though money has not made him happy or pleased with life. He comes to a realization that life itself resembles sickness because it has advancements and setbacks and always ends in death. Human advancement has given mankind not more able bodies, but weapons that can be sold, bought, stolen to prolong life. This deviation from natural selection causes more sickness and weakness in humans. Zeno imagines a time when a person will invent a new, powerful weapon of mass destruction, just like the modern atomic bomb, that wasn't invented yet at the time, and another will steal it and destroy the world, setting it free of sickness.

See also

 Unreliable narrator

References

External links
 e-text of La coscienza di Zeno on Liberliber (the Italian analogue of Project Gutenberg)
 Listen to some chapters of La coscienza di Zeno on audio mp3 – free download

1923 novels
20th-century Italian novels
Italian autobiographical novels
Modernist novels
Novels by Italo Svevo
Novels set in Trieste
Novels about psychoanalysis
Novels set during World War I